is a Japan-exclusive Game Gear role-playing video game. While the "Eternal Legend" name was used in both game packaging and advertising materials, the subtitle "Eien no Densetsu" (永遠の伝説) was only used to advertise the game for the Japanese market.

Summary

The player controls a boy who must save the world from the evil monsters and villains the roam the areas outside the villages and the dungeons. The game is considered to be an action-RPG similar to the Legend of Zelda and Secret of Mana style of video games. According to the story, the super-nation Millennium which had conquered the world before searches for the secret which had disappeared in one night. Up to three people can be in a party, these three party members are changed around depending on the part of the story that is being played.

Fifteen caves and temples make up the complete dungeon system of the game. There are also fifteen different villages to browse through in the game. Pyramids and fortress tend to be the most challenging of the dungeons. This video game was released in the era of traditional role-playing games like Dragon Quest. During the selection sequence for a combat scenario, there is a common "battle" command for all members of the party.

Once the player progresses beyond a certain point in the game, he may use a ship as a form of transportation, similar in method to the ship found in the original Final Fantasy video game for the Nintendo Entertainment System.

References

1991 video games
Fantasy video games
Game Gear games
Game Gear-only games
Japan-exclusive video games
Role-playing video games
Video games developed in Japan